Anoscopus is a genus of leafhoppers (family Cicadellidae). The genus was first described by Carl Ludwig Kirschbaum in 1858. The species of this genus are found in Europe and North America.

Species 
The species in this genus are:
Anoscopus albifrons
Anoscopus albiger
Anoscopus assimilis
Anoscopus carlebippus
Anoscopus crassus
Anoscopus duffieldi
Anoscopus flavostriatus
Anoscopus gorloppus
Anoscopus histrionicus
Anoscopus limicola
Anoscopus petrophilus
Anoscopus samuricus
Anoscopus serratulae
Anoscopus siracusae
Anoscopus striatus

References

Aphrodinae
Hemiptera genera